Peter Nordbeck may refer to:
 Peter Nordbeck (silversmith)
 Peter Nordbeck (Swedish Navy officer)

See also
 Peter Norbeck, American politician from South Dakota